Atlantic Street station is a light rail station in Newark, New Jersey on the Newark Light Rail. The station is located in Downtown Newark, next to Atlantic Street, between the headquarters of IDT Corporation and its parking garage. It serves the business district near Bears and Eagles Riverfront Stadium. The Washington Park Post office is also located near this station.

The station is above ground, as is most of the second Newark Light Rail line, except for a two-track tunnel having a portal to the south of Center Street that connects the line to the original NCS line at Newark Penn Station. This station receives only northbound trains, which leave Newark Penn Station, make one stop at NJPAC/Center Street, enter the northbound line here at Atlantic Street, and continue on to Riverfront Stadium (service on game days only) and Newark Broad Street station. Service on this line opened on July 17, 2006, at 1:00 p.m. EDT.

References

External links

 Station from Bridge Street from Google Maps Street View

Newark Light Rail stations
Railway stations in the United States opened in 2006
2006 establishments in New Jersey